Sung poetry is a broad and imprecise music genre widespread in European countries, such as Poland and the Baltic States, to describe songs consisting of a poem (most often a ballad) and music written specially for that text. The compositions usually feature a delicate melody and scarce musical background, often comprising a guitar or piano. Some sung poetry performers are singer-songwriters; others use known, published poems, or collaborate with contemporary writers. Artists of sung poetry include people of various occupations usually with little or no particular music education, as well as stage actors. 

Notable Lithuanian and Polish artists include Kostas Smoriginas, Ieva Narkutė, Vytautas Kernagis, Alina Orlova, Ewa Demarczyk, Edyta Geppert, Marek Grechuta, Czesław Niemen, Jacek Kaczmarski, Magda Umer or from younger generation Ralph Kaminski.

See also

Art song
 Bard (Soviet Union)

External links
Website dedicated to Lithuanian sung poetry
Website of Lithuanian bards
Polish sung poetry – text, mp3, video clip

 
European music